BA Tango - Andrea Podlogar and Blaž Bertoncelj are a Slovenian dance and choreography team. Their focus is the Argentine tango.

They won the International Dance Organization (IDO) World Championship of Argentine Tango in 1998 and were invited to perform in Buenos Aires in 2003. They have already performed in the U.S., China, Hong Kong, Turkey, Germany, Poland, Italy, and Austria, among other countries, over the past ten years.

They have received the Waterman National Dance Award for their choreography in the dance performance "Tango Prohibido".

Works
 Choreographies for the drama "Zadnji Tango za Debevca in Franje"
 Choreographies for movie "Marko Skače" for Slovenian national Television
 Performance on the opening night of the Bavarian State Opera Summer Festival - VHB Festspiel Nacht, June 2009
 Tango Show "Subte" with tango quintet Distango, premiered in Augsburg, Germany, February 2008
 Performances and Workshops in Cape Town, South Africa, December 2008
 Tango choreography for a "Three Penny opera", Croatian National Theatre, November 2007
 Performance in Križanke on Druga Godba Festival as guests of tango quintet Astorpia, July 2007
 Tango Drama "Harmonia", premiered at the Cankar Centre, September 2006
 Performance on the Opening Night of the 3rd Belgrade Tango Festival, September 2006
 Choreography for a play "Češnjev vrt", Slovenian National Theatre, 2006
 Performance on the Opening Night of the 2nd Belgrade Tango Festival, September 2005
 Performance in Gdansk Philharmonic with tango quintet Distango, July 2004
 Performance at the V. International Festival of Argentine Tango in Buenos Aires, March 2003
 Dancers and actors in a film Tango -5, January 2003
 Choreographies for a drama Venice by Jorge Accame, directed by Argentinian Omar Viale, in Prešeren's Theatre in Kranj, 2002
 Multimedia tango performance "Tango E-Mocion", premiered in Prešeren's Theatre Kranj, October 2002
 Dance performance "Tango Prohibido", premiered at Dubrovnik Summer Festival, July 2001
 World Champions of Argentine Tango, IDO World Championship of Argentine Tango, France, November 1998

References

External links
www.BA-Tango.com
Harmonia Tango Drama

Tango dancers and choreographers